Suresh Peters (born 26 April 1968) is a multi talented artist in the field of Indian music. He is a music producer, a professional drummer, an award-winning music director in five Indian languages and a playback singer in multiple Indian languages for feature films in India.

Career
Having started his journey in music right from childhood, he went on to performing on stages since his school and college days. His primary instrument of choice was Drums and went on to collect accolades right from his school days. Having gained huge popularity as a musician since his school days he set out to become a professional in the field of Music at quite an early age.

Having finished college he tried his stint at advertising in the film department for a few years before venturing full time into music. During this time he was also actively playing sessions and shows in his free time with established Musicians and also was a part of a hugely successful rock band called Nemesis Avenue. It was during this stage he worked with A. R. Rahman before the latter went on to establish himself as one of the most prolific music directors in India.

It was during the time when A.R. Rahman started his first film venture called Roja that Suresh Peters joined him full time as his assistant. As Rahman having been associated with Suresh since his early college days, knew about his other talents which included singing. It was during composing for a film called Gentleman when Rahman gave him his first break as a playback singer for the song Chikku Bukku Railae, which went on to becoming one of the most popular Tamil hits of all time. With this unprecedented success came a line of songs delving Suresh Peters into singing songs in various of languages for feature films in India. Songs like Urvasi Urvasi, Pettai Rap, Chandralekha, Oru Koodai Sunlight, Super Police etc. were some of the biggest hits he churned out for A.R. Rahman. They went on to score a string of super hit songs which are considered as classics and popular to this very day. Having become popular as a singer it was time to put his talent into creating something of his own. His first break as a composer came in the form of an independent Music Album in Tamil, the first of its kind during that period titled Minnal. The Album became a huge success worldwide selling more than a Million copies in a very short span of time.

This changed the course of career for Suresh from a playback singer to a composer and thus came his first break as a Music Director for a Feature Film in Tamil called Coolie.

This paved way for a brand new opening into the Malayalam film industry where Suresh composed Music for a film called Punjabi House in 1998. Again this was unprecedented as this film went on to become one of the biggest hits in Malayalam thus paving way for a long line of super hit films with his music gaining almost cult status and his songs becoming more and more popular by the years. Malayalam films brought him a new freedom as his music was very different and well received by audiences worldwide. He worked with some of the best Directors and actors in this industry including veterans of Music from all industries in India. To date his popularity has been growing and Suresh enjoys a huge fan following for his music in 5 Indian languages. As singing and Music direction grew side by side, Suresh found new avenues in Hindi, Telugu, Kannada as well. He has established himself as a singer with super hit songs in these languages too and gave him the opportunity to work with some of the finest composers and Directors from these fields too.

One field he never quit through all this is creating jingles for advertising which he continues to this very day. He has now completed almost 30 years as a jingle producer which includes some of the top brands internationally and in India. His brands include Coke, Pepsi, Lakmé, Hindustan Lever, Ford Motors etc. to name a few. He continues to churn out jingles from his studio in Bangalore to this very day.

Peters has also established himself as an independent music artist with four successful albums in Tamil namely, Minnal, Oviyum, Yengirindho and Kaathirupen. These Albums gave him the break to experiment with various other genres of music and was well received from audiences worldwide. He still continues to play drums for sessions for various Musicians and has toured playing live for stalwarts like L. Subramaniam, Vikku Vinayakram, M. Balamuralikrishna, A.R. Rahman and also with his own Band.

Awards
Kalaimamani, 1998 
Received Prestigious Award for Creative Arts in the field of Music. Awarded by the Tamil Nadu State Government, 1998. 
Best Music Director Filmfare Award, 2000

Discography

As a singer

Tamil

Kannada
Nanna Preetiya Hudugi(kannada): "car car (kannada)"
Auto (Kannada): "Life Is Automatic"

Telugu
Kalyana Prapthirasthu - Oh Baby Tell Me
Akasa Veedhilo (Telugu): “Hottara Bera Bera”
Super Police (Telugu): "Choodara En"

Hindi
Bombay (Hindi, dubbed version): "Hamma Hamma".
Chor Chor (Hindi Dubbed version): Zor Laga
Khel Khiladi Ka (Hindi, Dubbed version): "Khel Hai Yeh Khiladi Ka"Jai Hind
Josh (Hindi): "Hum Bhi Hain Josh Main"
The Gentleman (Hindi): "Chika Pika Rika"

Malayalam
Kalamasseriyil Kalyanayogam (Malayalam): "Manikyaveena" (rap)
Punjabi House (Malayalam): "Sonare" (rap)
Thenkasi Pattanam (Malayalam): "Oru Simham" (rap)
Twenty:20 (Malayalam): "Hey Deewana"

As a composer
Punjabi House (Malayalam)
Coolie (Tamil)
Hanuman Junction (Telugu)
Runway (Malayalam)
Thenkasi Pattanam (Malayalam)
Thenkasi Pattanam (Tamil)
Independence (Malayalam)
Mazhathullikilukkam (Malayalam)
One Man Show (Malayalam)
Raavanaprabhu (Malayalam)
Malayali Mamanu Vanakkam (Malayalam)
Aparichithan (Malayalam)
Pandippada (Malayalam)
Twenty 20 (Malayalam)
Love in Singapore (Malayalam)
Colours (Malayalam)
Mr. Marumakan (Malayalam)
King Liar (Malayalam)
Connect India Anthem
Rhythm (Hindi)

References

External links 
 
 https://www.newindianexpress.com/cities/bengaluru/2022/jul/19/timeless-tunes-2477956.amp
 https://www.deccanherald.com/amp/metrolife/metrolife-lifestyle/on-my-pinboard-suresh-peters-776283.html
 https://www.deccanherald.com/amp/metrolife/metrolife-on-the-move/urvashi-singer-set-to-perform-live-772135.html
 https://www.thehindu.com/entertainment/music/king-of-the-jingle/article19565691.ece/amp/
 https://www.newindianexpress.com/entertainment/tamil/2017/aug/17/the-man-who-sang-pettai-rap-1644086.amp

Indian male playback singers
Tamil playback singers
Living people
Tamil film score composers
Tamil musicians
Malayalam playback singers
Kannada playback singers
Filmfare Awards South winners
1968 births
Indian male film score composers